Maşioba (also, Maşıoba, Mamyoba, and Mashioba) is a village in the Khachmaz Rayon of Azerbaijan.  The village forms part of the municipality of Mollabürhanlı.

References 

Populated places in Khachmaz District